Passaloecus  is a genus of wasps in the family  Crabronidae. The 40 species are found in the Nearctic. 
They are especially represented in the Palearctic

Species
These 48 species belong to the genus Passaloecus:

 Passaloecus annulatus (Say, 1837) i c g
 Passaloecus areolatus Vincent, 1979 i c g
 Passaloecus armeniacae Cockerell in Cockerell and Fox, 1897 i c g
 Passaloecus australis Merisuo, 1976 i c g
 Passaloecus borealis Dahlbom, 1844 i c g
 Passaloecus brevilabris Wolf, 1958 i c g
 Passaloecus clypealis Faester, 1947 i c g
 Passaloecus columnaris Ma and Q. Li, 2012 i c g
 Passaloecus corniger Shuckard, 1837 i c g
 Passaloecus cuspidatus F. Smith, 1856 i c g b
 Passaloecus cuspidifrons Merisuo, 1976 i c g
 Passaloecus dorsalis Kohl, 1912  c 
 Passaloecus dubius Tsuneki, 1955 i c g
 Passaloecus electrobius Budrys, 1993 g
 Passaloecus eremita Kohl, 1893 i c g
 Passaloecus erugatus Vincent, 1979 i c g
 Passaloecus fasciatus Rohwer g
 Passaloecus gallicola Vincent, 1979 i c g
 Passaloecus gracilis (Curtis, 1834) i c g
 Passaloecus hinganicus Merisuo, 1976 i c g
 Passaloecus insignis (Vander Linden, 1829) i c g
 Passaloecus koreanus Tsuneki, 1974 i c g
 Passaloecus labrinigratus Ma and Q. Li, 2012 i c g
 Passaloecus lineatus Vincent, 1979 i c g
 Passaloecus longiceps Merisuo, 1973 i c g
 Passaloecus melanocrus Rohwer, 1911 i c g
 Passaloecus melanognanthus Rohwer, 1910 c g
 Passaloecus melanognathus Rohwer, 1910 i g
 Passaloecus microceras Sorg, 1986 g
 Passaloecus miltoloma Vincent, 1979 i c g
 Passaloecus mishimaensis Tsuneki, 1990 i c g
 Passaloecus mongolicus Tsuneki, 1972 i c g
 Passaloecus monilicornis Dahlbom, 1842 i c g
 Passaloecus multituberculatus Ma and Q. Li, 2012 i c g
 Passaloecus munax Sorg, 1986 g
 Passaloecus nipponicola Tsuneki, 1955 i c g
 Passaloecus patagiatus Vincent, 1979 i c g
 Passaloecus petiolatus Ma and Q. Li, 2012 i c g
 Passaloecus pictus Ribaut, 1952 i c g
 Passaloecus piletskisi Budrys, 1993 g
 Passaloecus relativus W. Fox, 1892 i c g
 Passaloecus ribauti Merisuo, 1974 i c g
 Passaloecus scudderi Cockerell, 1906 g
 Passaloecus singularis Dahlbom, 1844 i c g
 Passaloecus turanicus Gussakovskij, 1952 i c g
 Passaloecus turionum Dahlbom, 1844 i c g
 Passaloecus vandeli Ribaut, 1952 i c g
 Passaloecus vigilans Merisuo, 1976 i c g
 Passaloecus zherichini Budrys, 1993 g

Data sources: i = ITIS, c = Catalogue of Life, g = GBIF, b = Bugguide.net

References

External links
Passaloecus images at  Consortium for the Barcode of  Life
 Catalog of Sphecidae California Academy of Sciences Institute of Biodiversity

Crabronidae
Taxa named by William Edward Shuckard